The Mark 28 torpedo was a submarine-launched, acoustic homing torpedo designed by Westinghouse Electric in 1944 for the United States Navy. The torpedo used all-electric controls. Service use of the Mark 28 ended after the introduction of the Mark 37 torpedo.

See also
American 21 inch torpedo

References

Torpedoes
Torpedoes of the United States
Unmanned underwater vehicles
World War II weapons of the United States